Hirtopelta tufari is a species of sea snail, a marine gastropod mollusk in the family Peltospiridae.

Distribution
Hirtopelta tufari lives in hot vent sites in the East Pacific Rise.

Description
The gill of Hirtopelta tufari is enlarged and there are bacterial endosymbions in the gill. Endosymbiotic bacteria provide nutrition to the snail.

References

Peltospiridae
Gastropods described in 2002